Below are the complete results of the women's singles tennis competition during the 1984 Summer Olympics in Los Angeles, when tennis was re-introduced as a demonstration sport.

Seeds

Draw

Finals

Top half

Bottom half

References

 ITF results

Women's singles
Oly
Women's events at the 1984 Summer Olympics